Benjamin, Benny, Ben is a Canadian short drama film, directed by Paul Shkordoff and released in 2020. The film stars Anwar Haj as Benjamin, a Black Canadian man on his way to a job interview, whose preparations are threatened when he trips and falls along the way.

The film premiered at the 2020 Toronto International Film Festival, where it was named the winner of the award for Best Canadian Short Film. It was also named as an official selection of the short films competition at the 2020 Cannes Film Festival, which proceeded in October 2020 despite the cancellation of the overall festival in the spring.

The film was named to TIFF's year-end Canada's Top Ten list for short films.

The film received a Canadian Screen Award nomination for Best Live Action Short Drama at the 9th Canadian Screen Awards.

References

External links

2020 films
2020 short films
2020s English-language films
Black Canadian films
2020 drama films
Canadian drama short films
2020s Canadian films